UNCW Soccer Stadium is a 3,000-capacity stadium located in Wilmington, North Carolina. The stadium is home to the University of North Carolina Wilmington Seahawks men's and women's soccer teams.

History 
UNCW Soccer Stadium hosted the 1996 CAA men's and women's soccer tournaments, as well as the semifinals of the 2008 and 2009 men's CAA tournament.

The stadium has hosted three NCAA Tournament games:

2020 NCAA Tournament 
UNCW Soccer Stadium was one of the host sites for the 2020 men's and women's NCAA soccer tournaments.

References 

Sports venues in Wilmington, North Carolina